One is the ninth and final studio album by American country music artists George Jones and Tammy Wynette. This album was released on June 20, 1995 on the MCA Nashville Records label. It was Jones and Wynette's first album together in 15 years; it would also turn out to be their last album together. The album was Wynette's last studio album she would record before her death in 1998.

Background
For many years, the idea of a Jones/Wynette reunion had been thought extremely unlikely.  The years following their divorce had been filled with acrimony and sniping, made all the more complicated by the fact that they still performed together on occasion.  "That wasn't my idea," Jones later insisted in his 1996 autobiography.  "In fact, I hated to work with her.  It brought back too many unpleasant memories, and when some fans saw us together, they got it in their heads that we were going to get back together romantically."  The publication of Wynette's autobiography Stand By Your Man in 1979, which painted an ugly picture of Jones – and the made-for-TV movie that followed – did not help mollify the relationship.  Jones, who hit rock bottom in the years following the divorce, accepted the responsibility for the failure of the marriage but vehemently denied Wynette's allegations in her autobiography that he beat her and fired a shotgun at her.  By the 1990s, however, both had been remarried for several years (Wynette to songwriter George Richey in 1978, Jones had to Nancy Sepulveda in 1983) and both were enjoying their recognition as country music legends.  While the reunion of Jones and Wynette may have been a surprise for many, there had been signs that much of the old enmity that had existed between them had faded.  In 1991 they performed together with Randy Travis at the CMA Awards and in 1994 Wynette joined Jones for his duet album The Bradley Barn Sessions on a remake of their 1976 number one "Golden Ring".  Their collaboration on One had been no doubt motivated by commercial factors as well; although Wynette had recorded a song with the British electronica group The KLF in late 1991 titled "Justified and Ancient (Stand by the JAMS)", which became a number one hit in eighteen countries the following year, and Jones had been  recording albums regularly on the MCA Nashville label since 1991, they had both fallen out of favor with country radio's youth-obsessed format.  Considering the history between the two and the media buzz it would generate, a reunion was suddenly an attractive, viable option.

Reception
AllMusic calls One "a pleasant listen" and contends, "The main pleasure of the record is hearing George and Tammy together again after all these years, but if One is judged by their previous efforts, it looks rather thin."

Track listing

Personnel

 Brian Ahern – acoustic guitar, electric guitar
 Richard Bailey – banjo
 Eddie Bayers – drums
 Harold Bradley – bass guitar, six-string bass guitar
 David Briggs – keyboards
 Glen Duncan – fiddle
 Stuart Duncan – fiddle
 Paul Franklin – pedal steel guitar
 Steve Gibson – electric guitar
 Owen Hale – drums
 Randy Howard – fiddle
 John Hughey – pedal steel guitar
 Roy Huskey, Jr. – upright bass
 George Jones – acoustic guitar, lead vocals, background vocals
 Liana Manis – background vocals
 Brent Mason – electric guitar
 Mac McAnally – acoustic guitar
 Steve Nathan – keyboards
 Louis Dean Nunley – background vocals
 Jennifer O'Brien – background vocals
 Hargus "Pig" Robbins – keyboards
 Matt Rollings – keyboards
 John Wesley Ryles – background vocals
 Randy Scruggs – acoustic guitar
 Glenn Worf – bass guitar
 Tammy Wynette – lead vocals, background vocals
 Curtis Young – background vocals

References

External links
 George Jones' Official Website
 Tammy Wynette's Official Website
 Record Label

1995 albums
George Jones albums
Tammy Wynette albums
Collaborative albums
Albums produced by Norro Wilson
Albums produced by Tony Wilson
MCA Records albums
Vocal duet albums